Bakhodyr Rakhmanov (born 17 March 1964 in Pakhtakor) is a former Soviet and Uzbekistani football player.

Honours
Navbahor Namangan
 Uzbekistan Cup winner: 1992

References

1964 births
People from Jizzakh Region
Living people
Soviet footballers
Pakhtakor Tashkent FK players
FC Polissya Zhytomyr players
Navbahor Namangan players
Uzbekistani footballers
FC Okean Nakhodka players
Uzbekistani expatriate footballers
Expatriate footballers in Russia
Uzbekistani expatriate sportspeople in Russia
Russian Premier League players
Association football forwards 
Association football midfielders